James Ward (28 March 1865 – 25 August 1941) was a semi-professional footballer who was part of the Blackburn Olympic team which won the FA Cup in 1883, playing at left back. On 14 March 1885, he played for England, his only international appearance, in a 1–1 draw with Wales. Ward was a cotton weaver by trade.

References

External links

1865 births
Footballers from Blackburn
1941 deaths
English footballers
England international footballers
Blackburn Olympic F.C. players
Association football defenders
FA Cup Final players